Margaret Stocks née Margaret McKane (1895-1985) was an English badminton and tennis player. She was born in London in 1895, and she married Andrew Denys Stocks in 1921. She came to prominence the same year when winning the All England women's doubles badminton title with her younger sister Kitty McKane. The following year, the sisters reached the 1922 Wimbledon Championships women's doubles final, losing to Suzanne Lenglen and Elizabeth Ryan. The sisters won a All England badminton doubles title in 1924, and Stocks became the singles champion in 1925.

Medal record at the All England Badminton Championships

Source:

Grand Slam finals

Doubles (1 runner-up)

References

English female badminton players
English female tennis players
1895 births
1985 deaths
British female tennis players
Tennis people from Greater London